Svyatoslav Dmitriyevich Kozhedub (born 22 May 2002) is a Russian football player. He plays for FC Chayka Peschanokopskoye.

Club career
He made his debut in the Russian Football National League for FC Spartak-2 Moscow on 1 August 2020 in a game against FC Chertanovo Moscow, as a starter.

He made his debut for the main squad of FC Spartak Moscow on 21 October 2020 in a Russian Cup game against FC Yenisey Krasnoyarsk.

References

External links
 
 Profile by Russian Football National League
 

2002 births
People from Kostanay
Kazakhstani emigrants to Russia
Living people
Russian footballers
Russia youth international footballers
Association football forwards
FC Spartak-2 Moscow players
FC Spartak Moscow players
Valmieras FK players
FC Akron Tolyatti players
FC Chayka Peschanokopskoye players
Russian First League players
Latvian Higher League players
Russian expatriate footballers
Expatriate footballers in Latvia
Russian expatriate sportspeople in Latvia